Separatism in the United Kingdom may refer to the separation of any of the countries (England, Scotland, Northern Ireland, Wales) or historical regions (such as Ulster, Cornwall, Mercia, and Cumbria).

Major movements

England 

On the political level, some English nationalists have advocated self-government for England.  This could take the form either of a devolved English Parliament within the United Kingdom or the re-establishment of an independent sovereign state of England outside the UK.

The English Democrats are an English nationalist political party that call for the creation of a devolved English Parliament within a federal UK.

Scotland 

Scottish independence is supported most prominently by the Scottish National Party, but other parties also support independence. Other pro-independence parties which have held representation in the Scottish Parliament include the Scottish Green Party, the Scottish Socialist Party and Solidarity. At the 2016 Scottish Parliament election, 69 of the 129 seats available were won by pro-independence parties (63 SNP and 6 Greens). The independence movement consists of many factions with varying political views. The SNP wants Scotland to keep the monarchy (see personal union) and become an independent Commonwealth realm, similar to Canada or Australia. Others—such as the SSP and Solidarity—want Scotland to become an independent republic. The SSP has led republican protests and authored the Declaration of Calton Hill, calling for an independent republic.

Irish reunification 
Northern Ireland is part of the United Kingdom but has a significant nationalist population who would prefer to be part of a united Ireland. In Northern Ireland, the term "nationalist" is used to refer either to the Catholic population in general or the supporters of the moderate Social Democratic and Labour Party. "Nationalism" in this restricted meaning refers to a political tradition that favours an independent, united Ireland achieved by non-violent means. The more militant strand of nationalism espoused by Sinn Féin is generally described as "republican" and was regarded as somewhat distinct, although the modern-day party claims to be a constitutional party committed to exclusively peaceful and democratic means. Northern Ireland voted to Remain in the EU Referendum alongside Scotland, the main consensus was that this vote came from a fear of a strong border between Northern Ireland and the Republic of Ireland, as well as fears of a hard border breaking the Good Friday Agreement.

Wales 

Welsh independence (Welsh: Annibyniaeth i Gymru) is a political ideal advocated by some political parties, advocacy groups, and people in Wales that would see Wales secede from the United Kingdom and become an independent sovereign state. This ideology is promoted mainly by the Welsh nationalist party, Plaid Cymru, and the non-party YesCymru campaign.

Less prominent movements

Cornwall
 

The Celtic League and Celtic Congress have a Cornish branch and recognise Cornwall as a Celtic Nation alongside the Isle of Man, Ireland, Scotland, Wales and Brittany. The league is a political pressure group that campaigns for independence and Celtic cooperation. Mebyon Kernow is a regional party in Cornwall that promotes Cornish nationalism.

Independent Northern Ireland

Independence has been supported by groups such as Ulster Third Way and some factions of the Ulster Defence Association. However, it is a fringe view in Northern Ireland. It is neither supported by any of the political parties represented in the Northern Ireland Assembly nor by the government of the United Kingdom or the government of the Republic of Ireland.

London
 

London independence, sometimes shortened to Londependence, refers to a belief favouring full-fledged independence for London as a city-state, separate from the United Kingdom.

North of England

Northern Independence refers to a belief favouring independence for the North of England. The North-South divide is of significant political and cultural importance in England.

References

 
Partition (politics)